Crunelle is a surname. Notable people with the surname include:

Gaston Crunelle (1898–1990), French classical flautist and teacher
Leonard Crunelle (1872–1944), French-born American sculptor